Love Gone Sour, Suspicion, and Bad Debt is the third album by the Pittsburgh, Pennsylvania, band the Clarks. The first single, "Cigarette", makes reference to Fayette County, the rural county located 35 miles south of Pittsburgh from which lead singer Scott Blasey hails. "Treehouse" and "Madeline" were local radio hits.

The album sold around 16,000 copies and led to a major label contract with MCA. It sold out of its initial pressing.

Critical reception
The Pittsburgh Post-Gazette wrote that the album "cruises along with a hook-heavy obsessiveness that puts it right up there with Tom Petty & the Heartbreakers and every other guilty pleasure left over from the '70s." In 1996, Erie Times-News determined that it "completed a move toward a rootsier, Americana vibe that occasionally conjured up influences like Tom Petty, Bob Seger, Bruce Springsteen, and the Silos."

Track listing
"Treehouse" – 3:00
"Cigarette" – 4:41
"Promised Land" – 5:09
"Now and Then" – 2:55
"Sun Don't Shine" – 4:02
"Better Day" – 2:34
"I'm the Only" – 4:38
"Behind My Back" – 3:34
"Climb Down" – 4:12
"Madeline" – 3:38
"Tell Me" – 3:45
"Already Down" – 3:44
"Sound the Warning" – 3:08
"Let You Go" – 4:08

Personnel 
 Scott Blasey - lead vocals, electric & acoustic guitars
 Rob James - electric guitar, vocals
 Greg Joseph - bass guitar, vocals
 Dave Minarik - drums, vocals

References

1994 albums
The Clarks albums